スコッチエッグのハードコア・チップチューン大百科 (trans. Encyclopedia of Hardcore Chiptune) is a Japanese compilation album from DJ Scotch Egg. The song collects songs from the first two albums (KFC Core and Scotch Hausen) and also includes some additional interludes, two videos and remixes.

Track listing

External links
Discogs release

2007 albums
DJ Scotch Egg albums